Scarlett Chorvat (born August 25, 1972 in Bratislava, Slovakia) is a Slovak American actress. She moved to the U.S. at the age of five.

Chorvat started playing tennis semi-professionally at the age of 15, but moved on to become a model, and finally an actress. Scarlett attended and graduated from Barbizon Modeling and Acting School in Michigan. She is best known as a model, counting numerous covers of magazines, advertising and TV commercials.

Filmography

References

External links

Czechoslovak emigrants to the United States
1972 births
Living people
Miss Hawaiian Tropic delegates
American film actresses
American television actresses
American people of Slovak descent
21st-century American women